Sack of Athens can refer to:

 the Sack of Athens (480 BC) by the Persians
 the Sack of Athens (86 BC) by Sulla
 the Sack of Athens (267 AD) by the Heruli

See also

 Siege of Athens (disambiguation)